Darvel transmitting station is a broadcasting and telecommunications facility located near Darvel, East Ayrshire, Scotland. The site is owned by Arqiva.

The transmitter carries analogue and digital radio stations, as well as digital television. Darvel previously carried analogue television until the digital switchover which took place during May 2011. The television services from Darvel require an A group aerial.

Services from the transmitter

Analogue radio (VHF FM)

Digital radio (DAB)

Analogue television

Digital television

Before switchover

External links
Darvel on The Transmission Gallery
Darvel on ukfree.tv
Darvel Transmitter at thebigtower.com

Transmitter sites in Scotland